The 2016 Purdue Boilermakers football team was an American football team that represented Purdue University in the 2016 NCAA Division I FBS football season. The Boilermakers were members of the West Division of the Big Ten Conference and played their home games at Ross–Ade Stadium in West Lafayette, Indiana. They were led by fourth-year head coach Darrell Hazell until he was fired on October 16, 2016. Gerad Parker was named the interim head coach for the remainder of the season. They finished the season 3–9, 1–8 in Big Ten play to finish in last place in the West Division.

Preseason
In 2015, Purdue compiled a 2–10 record (1–7 in conference play) during the regular season, failing to qualify for a bowl game for the third straight season.

Purdue had a coaching shake up prior to the season, when defensive coordinator Greg Hudson, offensive coordinator / quarterbacks coach John Shoop and defensive line coach Rubin Carter were fired on November 29, 2015. On December 22, 2015, it was announced that tight ends coach Terry Malone would be promoted to offensive coordinator in addition to his tight end coaching duties. Purdue hired former Syracuse Orange football offensive coordinator Tim Lester as quarterbacks coach. On December 30, 2015, Purdue hired Miami Hurricanes football defensive line coach Randy Melvin to coach the defensive line. Just two days later, Purdue announced that they had completed their coaching staff with the hiring of Lincoln Southwest High School assistant Ross Els as the defensive coordinator.

Purdue suffered attrition when offensive line coach Jim Bridge left to take the role of assistant head coach, special teams coordinator and tight ends coach with the Duke Blue Devils football team, and running backs coach Jafar Williams took the same position with Rutgers. Williams was replaced by Syracuse running backs coach DeAndre Smith, and Bridge was replaced by Akron offensive line coach Darrell Funk.

Recruiting

Position key

Recruits

Purdue's recruiting class consisted of 23 recruits, including three that enrolled early. Purdue's recruiting class was ranked 84th by Scout, 74th by Rivals, and 61st by ESPN.

Schedule
Purdue announced its 2016 football schedule on July 11, 2013. The 2016 schedule consisted of 7 home and 5 away games in the regular season. The Boilermakers hosted Big Ten foes Iowa, Northwestern, Penn State, and Wisconsin, and traveled to Illinois, Indiana, Maryland, Minnesota, and Nebraska.

The team also hosted all of the three non–conference games which were against the Cincinnati Bearcats from the American Athletic Conference (AAC), the Eastern Kentucky Colonels from the Ohio Valley Conference (OVC), and the Nevada Wolf Pack from the Mountain West Conference.

Schedule Source:

Radio
Radio coverage for all games will be broadcast statewide on The Purdue Sports Network and on Sirius XM Satellite Radio. The radio announcers are Tim Newton with play-by-play, Pete Quinn with color commentary, and Kelly Kitchel with sideline reports.

Game summaries

vs. Eastern Kentucky

Sources:

    
    
    
    
    
    
    
    
    
    

To begin the season, Purdue hosted the Eastern Kentucky Colonels. This was the first meeting between the teams since 2012, which saw Purdue defeat Eastern Kentucky 48–6.

Purdue won the game 45–24. Purdue opened the scoring in the first quarter with a 3-yard touchdown rush and added to its lead with a 1-yard run by David Blough. Purdue would increase their lead even more with a 78-yard interception return by Gelen Robinson. After Missouri transfer Maty Mauk struggled in his first drive, Eastern Kentucky opened their scoring near the end of the first quarter with a 10-yard pass to Dan Crimmins from Bennie Coley and added a two-point conversion with a Neiko Creamer rush. Purdue responded to Eastern Kentucky touchdown with a 35-yard touchdown pass to DeAngelo Yancey from David Blough. On the ensuing drive, Eastern Kentucky added 3 points with a 35-yard field goal by Lucas Williams. The Colonels would add a 10-yard touchdown run by Ethan Thomas to draw the score 28–18 at halftime. After both teams failed to score any points in the third quarter, Purdue opened the scoring in the fourth with a 1-yard run by David Blough. J. D. Dellinger added a 30-yard field goal and a 48-yard run by Brian Lankford-Johnson. Eastern Kentucky closed out the scoring with a 2-yard pass to Cameron Fogle from Tyler Swafford.

Purdue's 45 points scored were the second most in the Darrell Hazell era.

vs. Cincinnati

Sources:

    
    
    
    
    
    
    
    

After its game against Eastern Kentucky, Purdue will faced Cincinnati. Cincinnati defeated Purdue 42–7 in the previous meeting.

Purdue was defeated 38–20 by Cincinnati. Cincinnati opened the scoring with a 5-yard pass to Nate Cole from Hayden Moore. Cincinnati increased their lead with a 9-yard Moore run to make the score 14–0. Purdue got on the board with a 19-yard Domonique Young pass to David Blough. Cincinnati closed out the first half scoring with a 20-yard D. J. Dowdy pass from Moore to make the score 21–7. The only scoring during the 3rd quarter was a 26-yard field goal by Andrew Gantz. Cole scored again for the Bearcats on a 28-yard pass from Moore. Purdue's comeback attempt started with a 4-yard Richie Worship run. Purdue scored again on a 36-yard pass from DeAngelo Yancey from Blough. After Blough was intercepted by Mike Tyson on their next drive, Cincinnati capped the scoring on a 23-yard run by Moore.

vs. Nevada

Sources:

    
    
    
    
    

After playing Cincinnati, Purdue hosted the Nevada Wolf Pack. This was the first ever meeting between the two teams.

Purdue overcame an 11-point second quarter deficit to defeat the Nevada Wolf Pack 24–14. Purdue began the game with the loss of both of their starting offensive tackles, Martesse Patterson and Matt McCann for personal and injury reasons. Nevada opened up the scoring with a 15-yard touchdown pass from Tyler Stewart. Purdue answered back in the second quarter with a 36-yard field goal from J. D. Dellinger. After an exchanging of punts, Nevada increased their lead with a 6-yard touchdown pass to James Butler from Stewart. Purdue scored one more time before the half on a 48-yard pass to Bilal Marshall from David Blough to make the score 14–10 at the half. Purdue took the lead with the only score in the 3rd quarter with a 5-yard Markell Jones run. Purdue closed out the scoring with a 51-yard touchdown reception by Brycen Hopkins from Blough.

The win for the Boilermakers marked the 600th win in program history.

at Maryland

Sources:

    
    
    
    
    
    
    

Following its game against Nevada, Purdue began its Big Ten portion of the schedule when it traveled to the Maryland Terrapins. Maryland defeated Purdue 24–7 in the 2006 Champs Sports Bowl.

Purdue lost in a blowout, 50–7. The scoring began with an 11-yard pass to Teldrick Morgan from Perry Hills, on the ensuing point after attempt, Maryland ran a swinging gate and saw a matchup that they liked completing the 2-point conversion with Caleb Rowe's pass to Kenneth Goins. Maryland added to its lead on a 62-yard run by Lorenzo Harrison III, an 8-yard run by Ty Johnson and an 11-yard Hills run to make the score 29–0 in favor of Maryland at half-time. Maryland's lead grew larger with another touchdown pass to Morgan from Hills in the third quarter. Purdue cut into Maryland's lead with a 4-yard Cole Herdman touchdown from David Blough. Maryland closed out the scoring with two fourth-quarter touchdowns on a 48-yard run by Johnson and a Jake Funk 9-yard touchdown reception from Tyrrell Pigrome.

at Illinois

Sources:

    
    
    
    
    
    
    
    
    
    
    

After its game against Maryland, Purdue traveled to Champaign to face its rival, the Illinois Fighting Illini, for the Purdue Cannon. Illinois defeated Purdue 48–14 in the previous season.

Purdue defeated Illinois in an offensive battle, 34–31 in overtime. Illinois began the scoring with a 20-yard field goal by Chase McLaughlin. Following an exchange of punts, Purdue took their first lead of the game on a nine-yard run by David Blough. Another field goal by McLaughlin cut Purdue's lead to one, but Purdue answered back the following drive with a 32-yard run by Brian Lankford-Johnson. Purdue looked to be taking charge of the game with a 3rd down stop, but it was nullified by a roughing the passer hit on Wes Lunt by Danny Ezechukwu, injuring Lunt to the point where he would not return to the game. Chayce Crouch, who had been rotating in with Lunt at quarterback was now the full-time quarterback for Illinois. Crouch's running ability on the zone-read proved difficult for Purdue to stop as Crouch lead the Fighting Illini to a 26-yard touchdown run. Purdue responded with a 45-yard pass from Blough to Malik Kimbrough. Just before the half, McLaughlin made another field goal to give Purdue just a 21–16 halftime lead. Crouch opened up the second half scoring with a 3-yard run, giving Illinois their second lead of the game. Purdue regained the lead once again with a 37-yard J. D. Dellinger field goal just before the end of the third quarter. Kendrick Foster's 3-yard run just gave Illinois their largest lead of the game with 12:34 to play. On Purdue's ensuing drive Richie Worship scored on a 6-yard touchdown run to tie the game. Illinois would get a chance for the win when McLaughlin lined up for a field goal with seconds left. Darrell Hazell chose to use all three of his remaining timeouts in an attempt to ice McLaughlin. McLaughlin's kick would fall no good after hitting the right upright forcing overtime. Purdue won the toss and chose defense. Crouch fumbled on Illinois' first possession, recorded by Leroy Clark of Purdue. After a first down run by Worship, Dellinger kicked a 28-yard field goal to give Purdue the victory.

vs. Iowa

Sources:

    
    
    
    
    
    
    
    
    
    
    

Following its clash with Illinois, Purdue hosted the Iowa Hawkeyes for its homecoming game. The 2015 season saw Iowa defeat Purdue 40–20.

Iowa defeated the Boilermakers in a shootout, 49–35. Iowa opened up the scoring with a 1-yard run by LeShun Daniels. Iowa increased their lead with a 3rd down scramble for a 15-yard touchdown run by C. J. Beathard. After a quick 3-and-out by Purdue, Iowa scored again on a 42-yard Beathard pass to Riley McCarron, closing out the first quarter scoring. After several exchanges of punts, Iowa scored again on a 4-yard run by Daniels. Purdue scored their first points of the game with a 25-yard pass from David Blough to Brycen Hopkins. After the kickoff after the Hopkins touchdown, Iowa scored on its first play with a 75-yard Akrum Wadley touchdown run to bring the halftime score to 35–7 in favor of Iowa. Purdue opened up the second half scoring with a 53-yard Blough pass to Cole Herdman. Iowa responded with a 5-yard Noah Fant touchdown reception from Beathard. Purdue scored again on a 7-yard pass from Blough to Bilal Marshall. After a 3-and-out by Iowa, who had put in their reserves, Purdue scored again on a 54-yard Blough pass to DeAngelo Yancey. After yet another 3-and-out, Iowa put in their starting defensive unit. Blough was intercepted by Desmond King, who returned the interception 41-yards for an Iowa score, increasing their lead to 21 again. Purdue scored once more with another Hopkins touchdown reception from Blough for 37-yards.

Head Coach Darrell Hazell was fired on October 16, 2016, the day after this game.

at Nebraska

Sources:

    
    
    
    
    
    

After its homecoming game against Iowa, Purdue traveled to Lincoln to face its in-division rival, the Nebraska Cornhuskers. Purdue defeated Nebraska 55–45 in the previous season.

Nebraska won the game 27–14 in Gerad Parker's head coaching debut. After a failed running back pass by Markell Jones was intercepted, Tommy Armstrong Jr. ran 22-yards to give Nebraska its first lead just 26 seconds into the game. On the ensuing drive, Purdue drove the length of the field and scored on a 1-yard touchdown reception by DeAngelo Yancey from David Blough. Drew Brown would hit a 30-yard field goal to regain the lead from Nebraska at the end of the first quarter. Purdue would take a lead when Blough found Yancey on a crossing pattern and ran 88-yards for a score. Purdue went into the halftime break with a 14–10 lead. Nebraska took the lead in the 3rd quarter with a 40-yard Armstrong Jr. pass to De'Mornay Pierson-El. Nebraska would score again on a 24-yard rush by Alonzo Moore. The final score came with 11:10 in the fourth quarter, on a 51-yard field goal by Drew Brown.

vs. Penn State

Sources:

    
    
    
    
    
    
    
    
    
    
    
    
    

After traveling to Nebraska, Purdue hosted Penn State Nittany Lions. This will be the first meeting between the two schools since Penn State defeated Purdue 45–21 in 2013.

Penn State won in a blowout 62–24. Penn State opened the scoring with a 3-yard touchdown run by Saquon Barkley. Purdue responded the following drive with a 1-yard run by Markell Jones. After the defense forced a punt, Purdue's offense drove 55-yards completed by a 1-yard touchdown pass from David Blough to Cameron Posey. Penn State would tied the game when Trace McSorley found Chris Godwin on a crossing pattern that went 38-yards for a touchdown. Purdue responded with a 42-yard field goal from J. D. Dellinger. Penn State responded with their own 33-yard field goal by Tyler Davis. With just 4:21 remaining in the half, Purdue and Penn State exchanged punts, Purdue drove to a spot where they would attempt a 39-yard field goal before the half, but Dellinger's kick missed wide left. The score was 17–17 at halftime. Purdue opened the second half with the ball, but on their first 3rd down, Blough was intercepted by Brandon Smith. Penn State then opened the scoring in the 3rd quarter with a 1-yard touchdown pass to Godwin from McSorley. Penn State extended their lead with a 4-yard touchdown run by Andre Robinson, and a 29-yard field goal by Davis. Purdue responded with a 62-yard touchdown pass from Blough to DeAngelo Yancey. Penn State capped the third quarter scoring with a 21-yard Miles Sanders touchdown reception from McSorley. After another 3-and-out by Purdue, Barkley took the first handoff of the 4th quarter 81-yards for a touchdown. Penn State completed the scoring with a 1-yard Mark Allen rushing touchdown and a 19-yard Robinson touchdown run.

at Minnesota

Sources:

    
    
    
    
    
    
    
    
    
    
    
    

After hosting Penn State, Purdue traveled to Minneapolis, Minnesota to face the Minnesota Golden Gophers. In the 2015 contest, Minnesota defeated Purdue, 13–41.

Minnesota defeated Purdue 44–31. After a big play-action pass by Minnesota to open the game, Purdue's defense was able to hold Minnesota to a 52-yard field goal by Emmit Carpenter. After a 4th down stop by the Gophers, Rodney Smith took a carry 35-yards for a touchdown and a 10–0 Minnesota lead. Purdue responded on their next drive with a 20-yard Cole Herdman touchdown reception from David Blough. After 3 series of stops by both teams, Blough found Cameron Posey on a slant route, take the pass 89-yards for a touchdown. Minnesota would score again on a 53-yard field goal by Carpenter. Minnesota regained the lead on a 2-yard run by Mitch Leidner. Purdue responded when DeAngelo Yancey took a slant route 60-yards for a touchdown. Minnesota was able to drive into field goal range and added a 28-yard field goal by Carpenter. Purdue decided to attempt to get into scoring range, but after incomplete passes and Minnesota time outs, they punted, giving Minnesota the ball with 15 second remaining. Leidner's first pass of the drive was intercepted by Antonio Blackmon, who was tackled at the 2-yard line with 5 seconds remaining. Purdue used the time left to find Brycen Hopkins for a 2-yard touchdown pass from Blough, giving the Boilermakers a 28–23 halftime lead. Minnesota scored the only points of the 3rd quarter on a 7-yard touchdown run by Smith. Minnesota expanded their lead in the 4th when Leidner scored a touchdown on a 9-yard rush. Purdue was able to get within one score with a 34-yard field goal by J. D. Dellinger with 5:10 remaining. After forcing a Golden Gophers punt, Purdue was driving, when on a 4th and 1 Jack Wegher fumbled giving Minnesota the ball back. Minnesota was able to punch in another touchdown on a 14-yard run by Smith. Purdue continued to attempt a comeback, but ran out of time.

vs. Northwestern

Sources:

    
    
    
    
    
    
    
    
    

After facing Minnesota, Purdue hosted the Northwestern Wildcats. In the 2015 contest, Northwestern defeated Purdue, 21–14.

Purdue was defeated 45–17 by the Wildcats. Purdue opened the game driving 61-yards and kicking a 26-yard field goal by J. D. Dellinger to give them an early lead. On Northwestern's first drive, the Wildcats saw it end early when Clayton Thorson's pass was intercepted by C. J. Parker who returned the ball to the Northwestern 33. From there, David Blough was able to lead Purdue to a touchdown, carrying the ball into the endzone himself from 1-yard away. Northwestern punted on their next drive. Blough's third down pass was intercepted by Montre Hartage. Coming off the interception, Thorson found Austin Carr from one yard out for the Wildcat's first score. After an exchanging of punts, Purdue took over at the Northwestern 34, however they turned the ball over on downs. The Wildcats then scored on a 33-yard Carr reception from Thorson, ending the first half scoring. Northwestern scored on a 14-yard run by Justin Jackson to open the second half. Purdue's drive ended short when Blough was intercepted by Anthony Walker. The very next play Thorson found Garrett Dickerson on a 42-yard pass for a touchdown. In response, Purdue took just 3 plays to go 75 yards concluded with a 49-yard touchdown reception by Bilal Marshall from Blough. The next drive for Northwestern ended with a 2-yard Thorson rushing touchdown. After a Purdue punt, Jackson scored again on a 9-yard run. The final score of the game came on a 23-yard Jack Mitchell field goal.

vs. Wisconsin

Sources:

    
    
    
    
    
    
    
    
    
    

Following its game against Northwestern, Purdue played its final home game against Wisconsin. Wisconsin defeated Purdue 7–24 the previous season.

The Boilermakers were beaten by Wisconsin 49–20. Purdue made the first score of the game, and the only score of the first quarter when J. D. Dellinger made a 28-yard field goal. Wisconsin scored their first points of the game halfway through the second quarter when Alec Ingold punched the ball in from the 1-yard line. After the kickoff, Purdue's first play was intercepted by T. J. Watt, who batted a David Blough pass to himself, and returned the ball 17 yards for a touchdown. 5 minutes later, Bradrick Shaw scored for the Badgers on a 7-yard run. After another Blough interception, Bart Houston found Ingold on a 19-yard pass for yet another Wisconsin touchdown, just 14 seconds after their last. Purdue responded when Blough found DeAngelo Yancey streaking down the sideline for a 75-yard touchdown. With 51 second left in the half, Shaw scored again on a 33-yard run to close out the first half scoring with Wisconsin leading 35–10. Purdue opened up the second half scoring when Dellinger hit a 30-yard field goal. Wisconsin increased their lead again when Alex Hornibrook found Jazz Peavy on a 25-yard pass for a touchdown. Wisconsin got their final score on a 6-yard Corey Clement in the fourth quarter. The final score of the game came when Blough found Yancey on a 10-yard fade route.

at Indiana

Sources:

    
    
    
    
    
    
    
    
    

Following its home finale against Wisconsin, Purdue faced its arch-rivals, the Indiana Hoosiers, in the 118th meeting of "Old Oaken Bucket". In the previous meeting, Indiana defeated Purdue for the third consecutive year, winning 54–36.

The Boilermakers were narrowly defeated by Indiana 26–24. After Markus Bailey intercepted a Richard Lagow pass and returned it to the Indiana one yard line, Purdue opened up the scoring with a 1-yard touchdown run by Markell Jones. Indiana responded on the next drive when Lagow found Mitchell Paige from 27-yards out for a touchdown. Purdue would turn their next possession over on downs, but got the ball back when Lagow was once again intercepted by Bailey. Purdue was forced to punt their next drive, in which Indiana responded with a 1-yard run by Zander Diamont for a touchdown, giving Indiana their first lead of the game. Purdue was able to respond with a 23-yard field goal on their next possession. After an Indiana punt, Blough was intercepted by Jonathan Crawford, who was able to return the ball in Purdue territory, setting up a 29-yard Griffin Oakes field goal. After the two teams exchanged punts, Purdue scored with 1:50 left in the first half on a 10-yard Cameron Posey touchdown from Blough, however Dellinger's point after attempt was blocked, giving Indiana a 17–16 halftime lead. Purdue regained the lead when DeAngelo Yancey scored on a 31-yard pass from Blough, the only score of the 3rd quarter. Indiana's first 4th quarter drive ended with a 46-yard Oakes field goal to draw Indiana within 2 points. After Purdue was forced to punt, Indiana drove 61 yards concluding with a 1-yard touchdown run by Devine Redding to re-gain the lead for the Hoosiers. Blough was able to drive and lead the Boilermakers to the Hoosiers 27-yard line, where on 4th and 14, he was intercepted again by Crawford in the end zone with 1:13 remaining. With two timeouts, Purdue forced a 4th and 3 for the Hoosiers with 11 seconds left. Indiana decided to attempt to run out the clock when Diamont ran backwards into his own end zone where he was tackled by Jake Replogle for a safety, making the score 26–24 with 1 second remaining. On the free kick, Brian Lankford-Johnson's lateral pass was caught by Crawford and he took a knee, sealing Indiana's fourth straight victory over Purdue.

2017 NFL Draft

Purdue extended a program record with 20 consecutive years with an NFL Draft selection. Purdue's only selection of this year came in the fifth round.

Roster

Awards and honors

References

Purdue
Purdue Boilermakers football seasons
Purdue Boilermakers football